Mex-3 homolog D (C. elegans), also known as MEX3D, is a protein that in humans is encoded by the MEX3D gene.

Function 

MEX3D is an RNA binding protein that interacts with AU-rich elements of Bcl-2. Upon binding, MEX3D has a negative regulatory action on Bcl-2 expression at the posttranscriptional level.

Structure 

MEX3 proteins contain two N-terminal heterogeneous nuclear ribonucleoprotein K homology motifs ( KH domain ) and a RING domain at the C-terminus.

References

Further reading